The Orange County Library System (OCLS) is a public library system located in the Orlando area of Central Florida. Its headquarters are located in the Orlando Public Library in Downtown Orlando. The System is made up of 15 total locations, one main library (Orlando Public Library) and 14 branch locations. In 2020, the library system employed over 350 staff throughout the system, serving more than one million Orange County residents. The Orange County Library System is a 501(c)3 organization. The library system is led by its Chief Executive Officer Steve Powell and a five-member Library Board of Trustees.

History of the Orlando Public Library

Before the Orlando Public Library came into existence, the Sorosis Club of Orlando  maintained a circulating library for its members. This collection was initially on the second floor of the Old Armory Building on Court Street, and was subsequently moved to the Knox building at the intersection of Pine and Court Street. On May 11, 1920, Orlando citizens showed by a vote of 417 to 19 that they wanted a public library and were willing to pay for it.

Captain Charles L. Albertson, a retired Police Inspector of New York City and a winter resident of Orlando, had for many years been collecting books at his home in Waverly, New York. In November 1920, Captain Albertson offered his collection to the City of Orlando, on the condition that it furnish a suitable building to house it. The contract between the city of Orlando and Captain Albertson provided that Orlando would accept the gift of the Albertson collection and furnish the library building; that the library should be known as the Albertson Public Library; that Captain Albertson should be Advisory Superintendent of the Library throughout his lifetime; and that Orlando should suitably maintain the Library.

In 1924, the Booker T. Washington Branch of the Albertson Library was opened in 1924 to service the African American community of West Orlando. This branch library was originally established in the former rectory of an Episcopal church. Eddie T. Jackson would assume the role as librarian, making her Orlando's first African American librarian, and would serve as such until her retirement in 1946. The library was relocated to a new building in 1954 and would stay in that building until 1984, when it was incorporated into the Washington Park Library in the Lila Mitchell Community Center. The building was purchased by the Shiloh Baptist Church in 1994 and renamed the building the T.C. Collier Center. A plaque now hangs at the 528 West Jackson Street location, in honor of the Booker T. Washington Library and its librarian Mrs. Gloria Riley Merriett. 

Preparation for the new 1966 building began in 1962, when construction of a new Main Library was approved by the Orlando voters, and the City acquired additional land adjacent to the original site. In 1964, the library moved to temporary headquarters at 905 North Orange Avenue until the Albertson building was demolished and construction began. The Orlando Public Library was dedicated on August 7, 1966. The architect was John M. Johansen of New Canaan, Connecticut. He called his design a "composition in monolithic concrete."

As early as 1974, the need to expand the Orlando Public Library was recognized. In 1978, the Library secured from the Orlando City Council a commitment for the whole block to the west of the existing site. In 1980 the voters approved the sale of $22 million in bonds for construction. At this time a special taxing district was also created, which provides funds for the library.

In March 1985, the 1966 building was closed. Work on renovating the old building began immediately. A Grand Opening Celebration for the expansion and renovation took place April 6, 1986.

The  building fills a whole city block. It was built with 19,000 cubic yards of concrete. A major challenge given to architect Duane Stark and his team was to design an expansion that would blend seamlessly with the original 1966 Johansen design. The measure of Stark's success is quite apparent in the exterior of the building. The color and texture of the new exterior walls were matched to the rough hewn cedar pattern of the original poured-concrete walls.

Friends of the Library 
Organized in 1949, a group of citizens formed "The Friends of the Orange County Library System." The role of this group is to raise funds for library resources and educate the Orange County community on the important role the libraries play in their lives. The Board of Directors steer the direction of the friends group, but anyone can become a "friend" through a yearly membership. The friends also run the library gift shop, located in the lobby of the Main library and the Friends of the Library Bookstore, located on the third floor of the Main library. Library volunteers are also managed by the Friends of the Library, offering volunteer positions at the bookstore/gift shop, at library events, and library shelving assistant opportunities at any of the library branch locations.

Branches

There are 14 branches  located around Orange County and one main location, the Orlando Public Library. Some of the services they offer include gaming, programs, and computer classes taught in the English, Spanish, and Haitian Creole languages.

Alafaya Branch

Known originally as the Azalea Park branch, the Alafaya branch opened its doors on February 1, 2000.

Chickasaw Branch

The newest addition to the Library System, the Chickasaw branch opened on July 18, 2015, in east Orange County.

Eatonville Branch

This branch, built opened in January 2005, honors the Eatonville resident Zora Neale Hurston.

Fairview Shores Branch

Opening originally in 1950, and previously known as the Edgewater branch, the newest Fairview Shores branch opened in June 2019.

Hiawassee Branch 

Beginning as a bookmobile station in 196, the Hiawassee branch has moved twice in the recent years and in 2010, opened its doors in its current location.

North Orange Branch

Another branch that started off as a bookmobile station, the branch moved in both 1969 and 1989 to its current location in Apopka.

South Creek Branch

Replacing the South Orange branch in 2002, the South Creek branch has been residing in the Deerfield area.

South Trail Branch

Beginning as the Fort Gatlin Branch in 1965, it moved and became the South Trail branch in 1981, then moved once more in 1996 to its current location on South Orange Blossom Trail.

Southeast Branch

Located just a couple miles from the Orlando International Airport on Semoran Blvd in Orlando.

Southwest Branch

Near International Drive, the Southwest branch opened its doors on March 21, 1989.

Washington Park Branch

Dating back to 1924, it combines the former Booker T. Washington and Washington Shores Libraries. Washington Park opened its doors on April 11, 1984.

West Oaks Branch and Genealogy Center

Located in the city of Ocoee, the West Oaks branch opened in August of 2001, then added the Genealogy Center in January 2015.

Windermere Branch

Located in a homestyle building with a wrap-around porch, the Windermere branch was added to the Orange County Library System in August 1991.

Winter Garden Branch

In the western part of Orange County, the Winter Garden branch was built in 2005 and was also built on donated land.

Materials Access to Your Library

The Materials Access to Your Library (MAYL) is the Orange County Library System's free home delivery of requested material. MAYL was started in 1974 and is considered a "virtual branch." Items that can be requested via the MAYL service include audio-books, music CDs, books, and DVDs. The Orange County Library System used to circulate video games, but this was stopped in order to reduce operating expenses.

Orange County Library Systems also used to offer an Inter-Library Loan program, but this was stopped in 2010 due to low demand and replaced with a service called Suggest-A-Title.

Technology

Through its website, OCLS offers podcasts and video podcasts of storytelling and other library events, blogs, and LibGuides on topics that include travel, history, holidays, and more. OCLS cardholders have access to a variety of electronic resources, including databases, downloadable audio books, e-books, streaming videos and virtual computer classes.  The library system features free Wi-Fi access in all locations for library card holders and allows non-card holders to pay a fee for temporary use.  In addition, all locations house public computers with Internet access.  Several locations provide self-checkout stations that allow customers to check out materials on their own. The library materials that are housed in self-checkout locations are given Radio Frequency Identification (RFID) tags, which store information about the items and identify material at the point of checkout. OCLS was the first public library to offer RSS (Really Simple Syndication) feeds. To those who subscribe to the feeds, the library delivers news about library events, new technology, and information for children and teens.

The Dorothy Lumley Melrose Center for Technology, Innovation & Creativity
Through a gift from the Kendrick B. Melrose Family Foundation, the Library opened The Dorothy Lumley Melrose Center for Technology, Innovation and Creativity (Melrose Center). The center is named for Mr. Melrose's mother, who had an interest in emerging technologies, and played a role in rebuilding the Orlando Public Library. It is located in 26,000 sq. ft. of space on the Orlando Public Library's second floor where a projection of Dorothy Lumley stands to greet incoming patrons. The Melrose Center offers access to an Audio, Video and Photo Studio, Fablab, Simulation Lab, Research and Collaboration Space, Digital Wall, Classroom, Conference Room, and monthly Tech Talks in Tech Central. Some of the simulations offered by the Melrose Center include driving simulators, forklift simulators, and flying simulators The center opened to the public on February 8, 2014. 

Dorothy Lumley Melrose, originally from Chicago and a graduate of the University of Illinois, moved with her husband to Orlando in the 1930s.  While raising a family, Dorothy taught math, English, and public speaking at Memorial Junior High School. She helped raise money to rebuild what is now the Orlando Public Library, taught at Memorial Middle School and later in life became the first female stockbroker in the city.

The $1 million from Melrose's family foundation is the largest single donation ever made to the Orange County Library System, which was named the Library of the Future in 2011 by the American Library Association.

Grants, Awards, and Recognition 

In 2017, the library received a Dollar General Literacy Foundation Award for $10,000 to expand its ESL classes. In June 2017, the library received a $25,000 grant for the Sunshine State Author Series from the Florida Department of State Division of Cultural Affairs. This grant allowed the library to bring in authors for readings, book discussions and writing workshops geared towards children, teens and young adults. Some of the authors featured in the series included Sharon Draper, Sarah Weeks and Jason Reynolds. In August 2018, the library was a recipient of the Disney Grant for $50,000. In 2018, OCLS also received a National Medal for Museum and Library Service from the Institute of Museum and Library Services. In May 2019, the library received the Betty Davis Miller Youth Services Award from The Florida Library Association. In 2021, the library received four awards from the Florida Library Association, including Library of the Year, "Librarians Change People's Lives," Youth Services Award, and a Lifetime Achievement Award for director Mary Anne Hodel.

Elimination of Overdue Fines 
On Thursday, October 13, two Orange County Library System staff members presented the Board of Trustees with a recommendation to eliminate fines on overdue materials. This recommendation was based on two factors: 1) The Orange County Library System has seen a steady decline in overdue fines over the past several years 2) overdue fines can create a barrier to those trying to use library resources. 

Ultimately, the board decided that the revenue generated by overdue fines was insufficient when compared to the amount of time and effort required by staff to pursue fines. Library Director, Steve Powell, noted that other library systems throughout the country who have abolished fines have seen an increase in returned overdue items, and an increase in library usage. The motion carried 4-0.  

Effective Sunday, October 16th, the Orange County Library System stopped collecting fines on overdue materials. Additionally, all pre-existing overdue fines were cleared from library users’ accounts. All materials still have due dates, and library users will continue to receive notifications as that due date approaches. If an item is not returned within 14 days of its due date, the library user’s account will be blocked, and they will be unable to use their account until the overdue item is returned or paid for. Also, library users will continue to be charged for items returned damaged.  

This decision was in line with a nationwide trend to eliminate public library overdue fines, as they present a barrier of access to users. Additionally, this decision was made in preparation of the Orange County Library System’s 100-year anniversary in 2023.

See also
 List of libraries
 University of Central Florida Libraries

References

External links
 

Orange
Library
Education in Orlando, Florida
Public libraries in Florida
1923 establishments in Florida
Libraries established in 1923